Rudolf Lettinger (26 October 1865 in Hamburg – 21 March 1937 in Berlin-Schöneberg) was a German stage and film actor. He made his stage debut in 1883 when he played the role of Kosinsky in Friedrich Schiller's drama The Robbers. Some of his more prominent roles in his prestigious stage career were Cyrano de Bergerac and Gessler in William Tell. He also worked with acclaimed stage director Max Reinhardt. In 1912, Lettinger played his first film role in Das Geheimnis von Monte Carlo. Lettinger appeared in over 90 films until 1931, mostly as a supporting actor. His best-known film is perhaps The Cabinet of Dr. Caligari (1920), where Lettinger portrayed Dr. Olsen.

Selected filmography

 Das Geheimnis von Monte Carlo (1912)
 Ein Gruss aus der Tiefe (1915) - Vareno Ziehtochter Rawalla
 Das goldene Friedelchen (1916) - Hermann Strecker
 Irrende Liebe (1917) - Carl Coster, ehemaliger Bankdirektor
 Das Legat (1917) - Geldverleiher Rosen
 The Onyx Head (1917)
 Jugend. Die Furcht von der Wahrheit (1917) - Pens.Kapitän Voss
 Das Klima von Vancourt (1917)
 Halkas Gelöbnis (1918)
 Die Ehe der Charlotte von Brakel (1918)
 Der lebende Leichnam (1918)
 Der Prozeß Hauers (1918)
 Erträumtes (1918) - Ehemann der Freundin
 Das Buch Esther (1919) - Vorsteher des Jehudims
 Moderne Töchter (1919)
 The Ocarina (1919)
 Die Geliebte Tote (1919) - Professor Thorwaldsen
 Die schwarze Marion (1919)
 Das Schicksal der Carola van Geldern (1919) - Jack
 Harakiri (1919) - Karan
 Der Tempel der Liebe (1919)
 Opfer (1920)
 The Mistress of the World (1920, Part VIII) - Detective Hunt
 Hate (1920)
 The Spiders (1920, part 2) - John Terry, the King of Diamonds
 The Cabinet of Dr. Caligari (1920) - Dr. Olsen
 Frauenruhm (1920)
 Kaliber fünf Komma zwei (1920) - Julius Goldberg
 The Brothers Karamazov (1920) - Oberst
 Whitechapel (1920) - Komissar
 Madame Récamier (1920) - Jacques Récamier
 Das schwarze Amulett (1920)
 Napoleon and the Little Washerwoman (1920) - Napoleon Bonaparte
 Furcht vor dem Weibe (1920) - Handelsmarine-Matrose
 The Drums of Asia (1921) - van Daalen
 Night of the Burglar (1921)
 Der Gang durch die Hölle (1921) - Polizeikommissar Brown
 Aschermittwoch (1921)
 Barmaid (1922)
 Countess Walewska (1922) - Napoleon
 The Call of Destiny (1922)
 Nathan the Wise (1922) - Klosterbruder Bonafides - früherer Reitknecht Assads
 Victim of Love (1923)
 Maciste and the Chinese Chest (1923)
 Die brennende Kugel (1923)
 The Buddenbrooks (1923) - Kutscher Grobleben
 Der Tiger des Zirkus Farini (1923)
 Tragödie der Liebe (1923)
 Die Gräfin von Paris (1923)
 Quarantäne (1923) - Professor Hudson
 Count Cohn (1923) - Christian Schmidt
 The Great Unknown (1924)
 The Enchantress (1924)
 Kaddish (1924)
 Strong Winds (1924, part 9)
 Hunted Men (1924) - F. A. Mertens
 The Creature (1924)
 Playing with Destiny (1924) - Ortsgeistlicher
 The Man on the Comet (1925) - Benjamin
 Women of Luxury (1925) - Hermann von Benthien
 The Great Opportunity (1925)
 The Woman with That Certain Something (1925) - Justizrat Walter Zug
 The Circus Princess (1925)
 Bismarck (1925, part 1)
 The Hanseatics (1925)
 The Girl from America (1925) - Bombarth, Faktotum
 Am besten gefällt mir die Lore (1925) - Herr Funke
 The Fallen (1926)
 Young Blood (1926)
 Sword and Shield (1926) - General von Grumbkow
 The Good Reputation (1926)
 The Young Man from the Ragtrade (1926)
 Die Piraten der Ostseebäder (1927)
 Bismarck 1862–1898 (1927)
 Students' Love (1927)
 The Catwalk (1927) - Merkel - Ortsschulze
 The Most Beautiful Legs of Berlin (1927)
 The Holy Lie (1927)
 Da hält die Welt den Atem an (1927)
 Was die Kinder ihren Eltern verschweigen (1927) - Vater Wohlmuth
 Caught in Berlin's Underworld (1927) - Maroff
 King of the Centre Forwards (1927) - Jakob Meeling
 Petronella (1927) - Pias Vater
 Girls, Beware! (1928)
 Luther (1928) - Luthers Vater
 The Great Adventuress (1928) - Secretary
 Schneeschuhbanditen (1928)
 Volga Volga (1928)
 Die von der Scholle sind (1928)
 The Customs Judge (1929) - Justizwachmeister Böhm
 Madame Lu, die Frau für diskrete Beratung (1929)
 Beware of Loose Women (1929) - Wilhelm Hasse, Hotelier
 Es war einmal ein treuer Husar (1929) - Der Kronenwirt
 Freiheit in Fesseln (1930) - Schulze, Kahnführer
 Die Jugendgeliebte (1930)
 Witnesses Wanted (1930) - Fred Hiller
 Different Morals (1931) - Kommerzienrat Hormeyer
 Der Liebesarzt (1931) - Townbridge
 In Wien hab' ich einmal ein Mädel geliebt (1931)
 Emil and the Detectives (1931) - (final film role)

Bibliography
 Jung, Uli & Schatzberg, Walter. Beyond Caligari: The Films of Robert Wiene. Berghahn Books, 1999.

External links

1865 births
1937 deaths
German male film actors
German male stage actors
German male silent film actors
Male actors from Berlin
20th-century German male actors